The 1977 FIFA World Youth Championship was the inaugural staging of the FIFA World Youth Championship, hosted by Tunisia from 27 June to 10 July 1977, in three venues — Tunis, Sousse and Sfax. The 28 matches played were the smallest number in tournament history. The USSR U20, defeated Mexico U20 in a penalty shootout, in the final held at Tunis's Stade El Menzah.

The Tournament Committee was chaired by FIFA Vice-President Harry Cavan, who had spearheaded the creation of the World Youth Championship.

Qualification

Squads 
For a list of all squads that began play in the group stage of the tournament, see 1977 FIFA World Youth Championship squads

Venues

Group stage 

The group winners advanced directly to the semifinals.

Group A

Group B

Group C

Group D

Knockout stage

Semi-finals

Third place play-off

Final

Result

Awards

Goalscorers 

Guina of Brazil won the Golden Shoe award for scoring four goals. In total, 70 goals were scored by 49 different players, with none of them credited as own goal.

4 goals
  Guina
3 goals
  Hussein Saeed
  Agustin Manzo
  Luis Placencia
  Vladimir Bessonov
2 goals

  Cléber
  Paulinho
  Paulo Roberto
  Moharam Asheri
  Hussain Munshid
  Fernando Garduno
  Pedro López
  Valeri Petrakov
  José Ricardo Escobar
  Amaro Nadal

1 goal

  Heinz Weiss
  Jorge Luís
  Júnior Brasília
  Tião
  Andre Wiss
  Gerard Bacconnier
  Thierry Meyer
  Gilberto Yearwood
  José Enrique Duarte
  Prudencio Norales
  Imre Nagy
  János Kerekes
  Zoltán Péter
  Reza Rajabi
  Abdolreza Barzegar
  Haddi Hammadi
  Luigi Capuzzo
  Honore Ya Semon
  Lucien Kouassi
  Eduardo Moses
  Eduardo Rergis
  Hugo Rodríguez
  Eugenio Giménez
  Domingo Salmaniego
  Juan Battaglia
  Víctor Morel
  Andrei Bal
  Vagiz Khidiyatullin
  José Casas
  Ali Ben Fattoum
  Alberto Bica
  Daniel Enrique
  Venancio Ramos
  Víctor Diogo

Final ranking

Notes

External links 
 FIFA World Youth Championship Tunisia 1977 , FIFA.com
 RSSSF > FIFA World Youth Championship > 1977
 FIFA Technical Report
 All Matches of the Brazilian Soccer Team
 Todos os Jogos da Seleção Brasileira de Futebol

FIFA World Youth Championship
International association football competitions hosted by Tunisia
Fifa World Youth Championship, 1977
1977 in Tunisian sport
June 1977 sports events in Africa
July 1977 sports events in Africa